This is a list of episodes for the television series Herman's Head.

Series overview

Broadcast history

Episodes

Season 1 (1991–92)

Season 2 (1992–93)

Season 3 (1993–94)

References

External links
 
 

Herman's Head